Western Charlotte may refer to:
Western Charlotte, a local service district near St. Stephen, New Brunswick, Canada
Western Charlotte, a provincial electoral district in southwestern New Brunswick